Delhi Sarai Rohilla railway station (station code: DEE) is situated about  from old Delhi railway junction in India. It is managed by Delhi Division of Northern Railway zone. Many trains from Delhi to Haryana, Punjab, Rajasthan and Gujarat stop at this station. More than twenty trains including Duronto and AC trains originate at this station.

Etymology
Sarai means an inn or resting place for travellers. The station is named after the medieval village it was located in. The village itself was named after a sarai, named after Ruhullah Khan, a noble in the Mughal court. Once it was a sarai on the busy road to Delhi and pilgrimage town of Ajmer. He was one of the three sons of Khalil Ullah Khan, the Governor of Delhi province during reign of Mughal Emperor Shahjahan, and also a distant relative of Empress Mumtaz Mahal. Over time, this name has been corrupted to Rohilla after Rohillas who ruled a region called Rohilkhand around Bareilly and Rampur northeast of Delhi during the Mughal era.

History

Start
Delhi Sarai Rohilla Terminal railway station was established in 1872 when the metre-gauge railway line from Delhi to Jaipur and Ajmer was being laid. It was a small station just outside Delhi as Delhi was confined to walled city then. All the metre-gauge trains starting from (and terminating at) Delhi (station code DLI) to Rewari, Punjab, Rajasthan and Gujarat passed through this station. The track from Delhi Junction to Sarai Rohilla Terminal was double. The single track from Sarai Rohilla to Rewari was doubled up to Rewari from where single tracks diverged in five directions.

Gauge conversion
Conversion of metre gauge to  broad gauge started in 1991. The Delhi–Rewari railway line had double metre-gauge tracks and one of the tracks was converted to broad gauge in December 1994 as a part of conversion of Ajmer–Delhi line. Within a few years, both the tracks from Sarai Rohilla to Delhi railway station were converted to broad gauge and all metre-gauge trains stopped operating from Delhi station. As a result of this, all the metre-gauge trains terminated and started from Sarai Rohilla which became a railway terminus.

By September 2006, the second metre-gauge track from Sarai Rohilla to Rewari was also converted to broad gauge and all metre-gauge trains stopped operating between Rewari and Sarai Rohilla (though the converted track was opened for public use only in October 2007).

Infrastructure
Delhi Sarai Rohilla Terminal railway station has been developed as a terminus. Many trains originating from Delhi city towards Haryana, Punjab, Rajasthan, Gujarat, Madhya Pradesh and Mumbai now start from Sarai Rohilla railway station and end there. It has a ticket reservation centre, three washing lines for train rakes and five platforms. Two platforms of adjacent Vivekanandpuri railway halt are connected to Sarai Rohilla railway station by a common foot overbridge.

There are plans to redevelop the station as part of the Smart Cities Mission, and a memorandum of understanding (MoU) to this effect was signed between the Ministry of Urban Development and Indian Railways in October 2016. As per the MoU, areas around the station will also be redeveloped and the redevelopment aims to achieve better passenger amenities, easy access, integrated public transport hubs, optimal utilization of land, etc.

Anand Vihar Terminal and Hazrat Nizamuddin Terminal are two more railway terminals in the city of Delhi from where many regional and long-distance trains originate.

Trains
Earlier all the trains from Sarai Rohilla to Delhi used to terminate at Delhi railway station as the metre-gauge tracks ended there. Now the tracks are broad gauge and therefore many trains from Punjab, Haryana, Rajasthan and Gujarat going north or east of Delhi pass through Sarai Rohilla and continue beyond Old Delhi station.

Connectivity
The nearest metro station is "Shastri Nagar" (Red Line), which is about 1km from the railway station.

See also

 Indian Railways
 
 
 
 Grand Trunk Express
 Anand Vihar Terminal railway station
 Rewari railway junction
 Delhi Suburban Railway
 Delhi Metro
 Delhi Cantonment railway station

References

External links
 
 

Railway stations in North Delhi district
Delhi railway division
Railway stations opened in 1873
1873 establishments in India
Caravanserais in India
Rohilla